Margaret Mary Murnane NAS AAA&S (born 1959) is Distinguished Professor of Physics at the University of Colorado at Boulder, having moved there in 1999, with past positions at the University of Michigan and Washington State University. She is currently Director of the STROBE NSF Science and Technology Center, and is among the foremost active researchers in laser science and technology. Her interests and research contributions span topics including atomic, molecular, and optical physics, nanoscience, laser technology, materials and chemical dynamics, plasma physics, and imaging science. Her work has earned her multiple awards including the prestigious MacArthur Fellowship award in 2000, the Frederic Ives Medal/Quinn Prize in 2017, the highest award of The Optical Society, and the 2021 Benjamin Franklin Medal in Physics.

Early life 

Born and raised in County Limerick, Ireland, Murnane became interested in physics through her father who was a primary school teacher. She received her B.A. and M.S. from University College, Cork. She moved to the United States to study at the University of California at Berkeley where she earned her PhD in 1989. She is married to physics professor Henry Kapteyn. They work together and operate their own lab at JILA at the University of Colorado.

Work 
Murnane has co-authored more than 500 articles in peer reviewed journals, with her work receiving ~35000 cites. Margaret is a founder of the field of ultrafast x-ray science, having made transformational contributions to this area of research in every decade since the 1980s. She is also currently the most-accomplished woman laboratory experimental physicist in the US, further distinguished by having independently developed her university-based laboratory effort with Prof. Kapteyn. In their lab, Murnane, Kapteyn, and their students make lasers whose beams flash like a strobe light – except that each flash is a trillion times faster. These lasers, like camera flashes, make it possible to record the motions of atoms in chemical reactions, and of atoms and electrons in materials systems. Some of her lasers can generate pulses of less than 10 femtoseconds. Using the very high peak power that it is possible to create with a femtosecond laser, it becomes possible to coherently upconvert light to much shorter wavelengths, in the extreme ultraviolet and soft x-ray region of the spectrum. This high harmonic generation process makes possible for the first time what is essentially a tabletop-scale x-ray laser light source. Prof. Murnane was the first to explore the use of femtosecond lasers for x-ray generation, and has made substantive pioneering contributions to many aspects of this area of research, including the science and fundamental understanding of the high harmonic process, the laser technology required to use this process to implement practical tabletop light sources for applications, and in applying this new source to make fundamental discoveries in areas ranging from basic atomic and chemical dynamics, to materials dynamics, to nanoimaging. She is also a founder the area now known as experimental "Attosecond Science," having performed foundational experiments that for the first time clearly demonstrated the ability to manipulate electron dynamics with attosecond precision. She is also co-founder of the laser company KMLabs, Inc., for which Intel Capital is a co-investor, and which has commercialized these technologies for research and possible industrial applications in nanometrology.

Honors 
2022 Isaac Newton Medal, from Institute of Physics (UK)
 2021 Benjamin Franklin Medal (Franklin Institute) in Physics.
 2017 Frederic Ives Medal/Quinn Prize in optics from The Optical Society
 2016 honorary doctorate from the Faculty of Science and Technology at Uppsala University, Sweden
 2015 Member of the American Philosophical Society
2015 Honorary doctorate from Trinity College Dublin
 2012 Willis E. Lamb Award for Laser Science and Quantum Optics
 2011 Boyle Medal
2010 R. W. Wood Prize, The Optical Society
 2010 Arthur L. Schawlow Prize in Laser Science
 2007 Fellow of the Association for Women in Science
 2006 Fellow of the American Academy of Arts and Sciences
 2005 Distinguished Alumnus Award, University College Cork (Ireland)
 2004 Member of the National Academy of Sciences
 2003 Fellow of the American Association for the Advancement of Science
 2003 Richtmyer Memorial Award Lecturer of the American Association of Physics Teachers
 2001 Fellow of the American Physical Society
 2001 Loeb Lecturer, Harvard University
 2000 John D. and Catherine T. MacArthur Fellow
 1998 Fellow of The Optical Society
 1997 Maria Goeppert-Mayer Award of the American Physical Society
 1993 Presidential Faculty Fellowship of the National Science Foundation
 1992 Sloan Foundation Fellowship
 1991 Presidential Young Investigator Award of the National Science Foundation
 1990 Marshall N. Rosenbluth Outstanding Doctoral Thesis Award of the American Physical Society
 1989 University of California President's Postdoctoral Fellowship
 1984 Regents Fellowship, University of California at Berkeley
 1983 University Fellowship, University of California at Berkeley
 1983 Pfizer Postgraduate Scholarship, Pfizer Chemical, Ireland
 1977–1981 College Scholarship, University College Cork, Ireland

References 

1959 births
20th-century Irish scientists
21st-century Irish scientists
Scientists from County Limerick
Fellows of the American Academy of Arts and Sciences
Irish physicists
Living people
MacArthur Fellows
Members of the United States National Academy of Sciences
University of California, Berkeley alumni
University of Colorado Boulder faculty
Alumni of University College Cork
Irish women physicists
Members of the American Philosophical Society
Fellows of the American Physical Society
Sloan Research Fellows
Fellows of Optica (society)
Fellows of the American Association for the Advancement of Science
University of Michigan faculty